Huaqiao may refer to the following stations:
Huaqiao station (Chengdu Metro), a metro station on Line 10 (Chengdu Metro)
Huaqiao station (Shanghai Metro), a metro station on Line 11 (Shanghai Metro) and Line S1 (Suzhou Rail Transit)
Huaqiao station (Changsha Metro), a metro station on Line 6 (Changsha Metro)
Huaqiao railway station, a railway station on the Shanghai-Nanjing intercity railway